The Central Tibetan Plateau alpine steppe ecoregion (WWF ID: PA1002) covers the high alpine plateau that stretches over  across the Tibetan Plateau to Qinghai Lake in China.  Because of the high altitude—much it over —the region is a cold, arid desert that is only 20% covered with steppe and meadow vegetation.  The area has been relatively free from human development due to the hostile climate and unsuitability for agriculture.  The ecosystem is relatively intact, and supports herds of wild antelope, sheep, deer, and gazelles.

Location and description 
Towards the west, the ecoregion is on the southern Changtang plateau, a part of the greater Qinghai-Tibet Plateau.  This area is a high basin between the even higher Kunlun Mountains to the north and the Himalayas to the south.  The plateau tilts gently down towards the southeast, with elevations of 6,000 meters on the Changtang in the northwest to 3,200 meters at Qingai Lake in Qinghai Province.  The terrain is generally rolling plains.  At wide intervals are shallow, brackish lakes.

Climate 
Precipitation ranges from 400 mm/year in the northwest to 200 mm/year in the southeast.

Flora and fauna 
Vegetation zones in the region are greatly affected by elevation and precipitation, but are generally sparsely covered. Precipitation controls which alpine zones will have meadow, steppe, or cold desert vegetation  Higher steppe elevations support sedges (Carex), with purple feathergrass (Stipa purpurea) increasing in lower altitudes. Wetter areas will support cushion plants and some woody forbs, but there are no trees on the plateau. Small stands of brush and trees can be found in the low, southern river valleys.

The area supports herds of wild Tibetan antelope, Chinese blue sheep (Bharal), several species of deer, and gazelles.

See also 
 Ecoregions in China

References 

Ecoregions of China
Montane grasslands and shrublands
Palearctic ecoregions